The Private Life of Don Juan is a 1934 British comedy-drama film directed by Alexander Korda and starring Douglas Fairbanks, Merle Oberon and Benita Hume. At the age of 51, it was the final role of Fairbanks, who died five years later. The film is about the life of the aging Don Juan, based on the 1920 play L'homme à la Rose ["The Man With the Rose"] by Henry Bataille. It was made by Korda's London Film Productions at British & Dominion Studios in Elstree/Borehamwood and distributed by United Artists.

Plot
After twenty years in exile, an aging Don Juan returns to Seville in secret with his friend Leporello trying to keep his health in check. His wife Dolores has threatened to have him thrown in prison because he won't see her after five years of absences. The next morning, he is surprised to find that all the town knows he is back. Rodrigo, an admirer of his, follows Don Juan everywhere, wanting to be just like him, and able to give a good impression of him with his own amorous advances. Don Juan prepares to flee to France but Rodrigo is killed by a jealous husband who believes he is Don Juan and all Seville now believes him dead. A book and play of his exploits are even written as he assumes the life of a Captain in seclusion. He attends his own magnificent funeral; six months later, having found many discomforts when pretending that Don Juan is dead (particularly when his statement of being Don Juan results in various moments of laughter from the people he tells), he returns to Seville. His attempts to discredit the play as fiction fall short as no one believes him, even when his "widow" is asked about him. However, the two reunite together in bed, complete with him breaking a window to get there.

Cast
Douglas Fairbanks as Don Juan
Merle Oberon as Antonita, a dancer of passionate temperament
Bruce Winston as the cafe manager
Gina Malo as Pepita, another dancer of equal temperament
Benita Hume as Dona Dolores, a lady of mystery
Binnie Barnes as Rosita, a maid pure and simple
Melville Cooper as Leporello
Owen Nares as Antonio Martinez, an actor, as actors go
Heather Thatcher as Anna Dora, an actress, as actresses go
Diana Napier as a lady of sentiment
Joan Gardner as Carmen, a young lady of romance
Gibson Gowland as Don Alfredo, Carmen's Poor Husband  
Barry MacKay as Rodrigo, the Impostor, a Man of Romance 
Claud Allister as The Duke, as Dukes Go 
Athene Seyler as Theresa, the Innkeeper, a Middle Aged Lady of Young Sentiment
Hindle Edgar as A Jealous Husband 
Natalie Paley as Jealous Husband's Poor Wife
Patricia Hilliard as The Girl at the Castle, a Young Girl in Love 
Lawrence Grossmith as Pedo, Uncle of the Castle Girl, Who Knows Better 
Clifford Heatherley as Pedro, Don Juan's Young Masseur 
Morland Graham as Hector, Don Juan's Cook 
Edmund Breon as Cardona, the Playwright, as Playwrights Go 
Betty Hamilton as First Tired Businessman's Wife 
Rosita Garcia as Second Tired Businessman's Wife 
John Brownlee as Singer

References

External links
 
 
 

1934 films
British black-and-white films
1930s romantic comedy-drama films
British films based on plays
Films directed by Alexander Korda
London Films films
British romantic comedy-drama films
United Artists films
Films based on the Don Juan legend
Films set in Spain
Films set in Seville
Films set in the 17th century
Films scored by Ernst Toch
Films produced by Alexander Korda
1934 comedy films
1934 drama films
Films shot at Imperial Studios, Elstree
1930s English-language films
1930s British films